The Daikyo Open was a men's professional golf tournament that was held in Japan from 1982 until 2000. From 1983, it was an event on the Japan Golf Tour. It was played at Daikyo Country Club (later known as Palm Hills Golf Resort) in Itoman, Okinawa.

Winners

References

External links
Coverage on the Japan Golf Tour's official site

Defunct golf tournaments in Japan
Former Japan Golf Tour events
Sports competitions in Okinawa Prefecture
Recurring sporting events established in 1982
Recurring sporting events disestablished in 2000